Murano is a surname. Notable people with the surname include:

Elsa Murano (born 1959), American university president
Jacopo Murano (born 1991), Italian footballer
Maria Murano (1918–2009), French opera singer
Yiya Murano (born 1930), Argentine murderer

Murano (written: 村野 or 邑野) is also a Japanese surname. Notable people with the surname include:

, Japanese ice hockey player
, Japanese model and actress
, Japanese film director
, Japanese architect

Japanese-language surnames